The Security Council of the Slovak Republic (Bezpečnostná rada Slovenskej republiky, SRB) is the advisory body of the Government of the Slovak Republic, which is involved in the development and implementation of the security system  and military policy of the country. It prepares proposals for the government to take measures to safeguard the security of the country, to prevent crisis situations, as well as proposals for solving the crisis situation. The Security Council of the SRB currently has 9 permanent members, with the acting prime minister (currently Eduard Heger) being the chairman.

See also
 Armed Forces of Slovakia
 President of Slovakia
 Security Council (disambiguation)

References

Government of Slovakia
Military of Slovakia
Slovakia